Thomas Emmet Mills (April 5, 1883 – February 25, 1944) was an American football player, coach of football, basketball, and baseball, and college athletics administrator. He served as the head football coach at Creighton University (1915–1919), Beloit College (1920–1925), Georgetown University (1930–1932), and Arkansas State College (1934–1935), compiling a career college football record of 63–45–12. Mills was the head baseball coach at the University of Notre Dame from 1927 to 1929, during which time he was also an assistant football coach at the school under Knute Rockne. In addition, Mills was the head basketball coach at Creighton (1916–1920), Beloit (1920–1923), and Arkansas State (1935–1936), amassing a career college basketball record of 107–25. Mills died at the age of 60 on February 25, 1944, of a heart attack at the Rockne Memorial Field House in Notre Dame, Indiana. He served as the director of the field house for the four years before his death.

Head coaching record

College fotball

College basketball

Notes

References

1883 births
1944 deaths
American football halfbacks
Arkansas State Red Wolves football coaches
Arkansas State Red Wolves men's basketball coaches
Beloit Buccaneers athletic directors
Beloit Buccaneers baseball coaches
Beloit Buccaneers football coaches
Beloit Buccaneers football players
Beloit Buccaneers men's basketball coaches
Creighton Bluejays athletic directors
Creighton Bluejays football coaches
Creighton Bluejays men's basketball coaches
Georgetown Hoyas football coaches
Notre Dame Fighting Irish baseball coaches
Notre Dame Fighting Irish football coaches
High school football coaches in Nebraska
Sportspeople from Beloit, Wisconsin
Coaches of American football from Wisconsin
Players of American football from Wisconsin
Baseball coaches from Wisconsin
Basketball coaches from Wisconsin